Nicola Rosenblum is an Australian diplomat who served as High Commissioner to Brunei Darussalam from 2016 to 2020. She has served as Deputy Head of the ANU National Security College, on secondment from the Department of Foreign Affairs and Trade, since October 2021.

Biography
Rosenblum earned a Bachelor of Arts in Politics and Government with Honours from Griffith University and a Graduate Certificate in Humanitarian Leadership from Deakin University.

References 

Australian women ambassadors
Living people
Year of birth missing (living people)
Griffith University alumni
Deakin University alumni
High Commissioners of Australia to Brunei